Takamiya (written: 高宮) is a Japanese surname. Notable people with the surname include:

, Japanese baseball player
, Japanese academic and writer
, Japanese long-distance runner

Fictional characters
, protagonist of the manga series Witchcraft Works
, supporting character of the light novel series Date A Live.

See also
Takamiya Station (disambiguation), multiple railway stations in Japan

Japanese-language surnames